His Great Chance is a 1923 film directed by Ben Strasser. It is a 5-reel feature film
 The film starred Tim Moore as well as Gertie Brown. It is a lost film. A comedy, Leigh Whipper wrote it was the best of the African American films he had seen. D. Ireland Thomas was less favorable and blamed poor direction for a missed opportunity. Theater owner and producer W. S. Scales of Winston-Salem, North Carolina also produced The Devil's Match in 1923 for his North State Films company.

Moore worked in various shows performing comedy routines in blackface.

References

1923 lost films
1923 comedy films